The superficial temporal vein is a vein of the side of the head. It begins on the side and vertex of the skull in a network of veins which communicates with the frontal vein and supraorbital vein, with the corresponding vein of the opposite side, and with the posterior auricular vein and occipital vein. It ultimately crosses the posterior root of the zygomatic arch, enters the parotid gland, and unites with the internal maxillary vein to form the posterior facial vein.

Structure
It begins on the side and vertex of the skull in a network which communicates with the frontal vein and supraorbital vein, with the corresponding vein of the opposite side, and with the posterior auricular vein and occipital vein.

From this network frontal and parietal branches arise, and join above the zygomatic arch to form the trunk of the vein, which is joined by the middle temporal vein emerging from the temporalis muscle.

It then crosses the posterior root of the zygomatic arch, enters the substance of the parotid gland, and unites with the internal maxillary vein to form the posterior facial vein.

Tributaries
The superficial temporal vein receives in its course the following:
 some parotid veins
 articular veins from the temporomandibular joint
 anterior auricular veins from the auricula
 the transverse facial vein from the side of the face

References

External links
 
 Diagram at Tufts.edu
 Diagram at stchas.edu

Veins of the head and neck